Winchester Lake State Park is a public recreation area covering  on the southern edge of Winchester in Lewis County, Idaho, United States. The state park surrounds  Winchester Lake at the base of the Craig Mountains. Fish in the lake include rainbow trout, perch, bass, and bluegill. Common wildlife includes white-tailed deer, Canada geese, muskrats, bald eagles, Columbian ground squirrels, and raccoons.

See also
 List of Idaho state parks
 National Parks in Idaho

References

External links
Winchester State Park Idaho Parks and Recreation 
Winchester State Park Map Idaho Parks and Recreation

State parks of Idaho
Protected areas established in 1969
Protected areas of Lewis County, Idaho